Janaud "JD" Notae (born October 27, 1998) is an American professional basketball player for Aris Thessaloniki of the Greek Basket League. He played college basketball for the Arkansas Razorbacks of the Southeastern Conference (SEC). He previously played for the Jacksonville Dolphins.

Early life and high school career
Notae was raised by a single mother, Stacy, and often lived with his grandmother or his mother's friends. He was separated from his mother for four years after she was imprisoned. Notae grew up playing football before starting to play basketball in eighth grade. He attended Newton High School in Covington, Georgia, where he played basketball alongside Ashton Hagans and Isaiah Miller. Notae was named GACA 7A North Player of the Year. He was lightly recruited and committed to playing college basketball for Jacksonville over offers from Kennesaw State and North Carolina A&T.

College career
Notae immediately assumed a leading role for Jacksonville. On December 28, 2017, he scored a freshman season-high 30 points in an 81–60 win over Middle Georgia State. On February 15, 2018, Notae suffered a season-ending foot injury during a game against NJIT. As a freshman, Notae averaged 15.4 points and 4.7 rebounds per game and was named Atlantic Sun Freshman of the Year. On November 21, 2018, Notae recorded a career-high 40 points, eight rebounds and five assists in a 123–77 victory over Florida Memorial. As a sophomore, he averaged 15.5 points, 6.2 rebounds and 3.4 assists per game, earning Second Team All-Atlantic Sun honors.

For his junior season, Notae transferred to Arkansas, choosing the Razorbacks over Seton Hall, Iowa State, Oklahoma State and Creighton, among others. He sat out for one season due to NCAA transfer rules. He suffered a broken wrist during offseason workouts in 2020. Notae was named Southeastern Conference (SEC) Sixth Man of the Year as a junior. He averaged 12.8 points, 3.1 rebounds, 1.9 assists and 1.4 steals per game, shooting 38.2 percent from the field. As a senior, Notae was named to the First Team All-SEC.<

Career statistics

College

|-
| style="text-align:left;"| 2017–18
| style="text-align:left;"| Jacksonville
| 28 || 28 || 31.4 || .410 || .405 || .699 || 4.7 || 1.9 || 1.8 || .5 || 15.4
|-
| style="text-align:left;"| 2018–19
| style="text-align:left;"| Jacksonville
| 32 || 23 || 29.2 || .427 || .320 || .730 || 6.2 || 3.4 || 1.6 || .4 || 15.5
|-
| style="text-align:left;"| 2019–20
| style="text-align:left;"| Arkansas
| style="text-align:center;" colspan="11"|  Redshirt
|-
| style="text-align:left;"| 2020–21
| style="text-align:left;"| Arkansas
| 32 || 1 || 22.6 || .382 || .335 || .760 || 3.1 || 1.9 || 1.4 || .3 || 12.8
|-
| style="text-align:left;"| 2021–22
| style="text-align:left;"| Arkansas
| 36 || 35 || 33.1 || .396 || .297 || .774 || 4.6 || 3.7 || 2.3 || .7 || 18.3
|- class="sortbottom"
| style="text-align:center;" colspan="2"| Career
| 128 || 87 || 29.1 || .403 || .330 || .746 || 4.6 || 2.8 || 1.8 || .5 || 15.6

Professional career
On August 18, 2022, Notae signed his first professional contract overseas with Greek club Aris Thessaloniki.

References

External links
Arkansas Razorbacks bio
Jacksonville Dolphins bio

1998 births
Living people
All-American college men's basketball players
American men's basketball players
American expatriate basketball people in Greece
Aris B.C. players
Arkansas Razorbacks men's basketball players
Basketball players from Georgia (U.S. state)
Jacksonville Dolphins men's basketball players
People from Covington, Georgia
Point guards
Shooting guards